Special Area No. 2 is a special area in southern Alberta, Canada. It is a rural municipality similar to a municipal district; however, the elected council is overseen by four representatives appointed by the province, the Special Areas Board.

Special Area 2 has two provincial parks, Little Fish Lake Provincial Park, and the portion of Dinosaur Provincial Park north of the Red Deer River. Lakes include Little Fish Lake, Dowling Lake, and the south portion of Sullivan Lake.

Geography

Communities and localities 
The following urban municipalities are surrounded by Special Area No. 2.
Cities
none
Towns
Hanna
Villages
Empress
Summer villages
none

The following hamlets are located within Special Area No. 2.
Bindloss
Cessford
Dorothy
Iddesleigh
Jenner
Richdale
Sunnynook
Wardlow

The following localities are located within Special Area No. 2.

Alness
Atlee
Batter Junction
Berry Creek
Bonar
Buffalo
Bullpound
Burfield
Carolside
Cavendish
Clivale
Comet
Dowling
Finnegan
Galarneauville
Garden Plain
Halliday
Halsbury
Howie
Hutton

Lawsonburg
Lonebutte
Lorne Crossing
Majestic
Medicine Hat Junction
Millerfield
Pollockville
Rose Lynn
Scapa
Scotfield
Sharrow
Sheerness
Spondin
Stanmore
Stoppington
Taplow
Trefoil
Watts
West Wingham

Demographics 

See also 
List of communities in Alberta
List of improvement districts in Alberta
List of municipal districts in Alberta
List of municipalities in Alberta

References

External links 

 
1959 establishments in Alberta
Special areas in Alberta